Dutlu can refer to:

 Dutlu, Kemah
 Dutlu, Oltu
 Dutlu, Şavşat